This is a list of music awards and award nominations received by the English singer/songwriter Kate Bush.
To date Kate Bush has received 13 nominations for BRIT Awards throughout her career, but has so far won only once, in 1987.

American Music Awards
The American Music Awards are given annually since 1973 to reward the most popular and successful musical releases of each year. Bush has been nominated once.

|-
| 2022
| "Running Up That Hill (A Deal with God)"
| Favorite Rock Song
| 
|-
|}

BMI London Awards
The Broadcast Music, Incorporated (BMI) Awards is an annual award show hosted for the purpose of giving awards to songwriters. Songwriters are selected each year from the entire BMI catalog, based on the number of performances during the award period.

|-
| 2003
| "This Woman's Work"
| Pop Award
|

Billboard Music Awards
The Billboard Music Awards are held to honour artists for commercial performance in the U.S., based on record charts published by Billboard.

|-
| 1985
| rowspan=3|Herself
| Top Pop Singles Artist - Female
| 
|-
| 1986
| rowspan=2|Top Pop Albums Artist - Female
| 
|-
| 1987
|

Brit Awards
The Brit Awards are the British Phonographic Industry's (BPI) annual pop music awards. Bush has received one award from thirteen nominations.

|-
| style="text-align:left;" rowspan="3"|1986
| Herself
| Best British Female
|
|-
| Hounds of Love
| Best British Album
|
|-
| "Running Up That Hill"
| Best British Single
|
|-
| style="text-align:left;"|1987
| rowspan="6" |Herself
| rowspan="3" |Best British Female
|
|-
| style="text-align:left;"|1988
|
|-
| style="text-align:left;" rowspan="2"|1990
|
|-
| Best British Producer
|
|-
| style="text-align:left;"|1993
| rowspan="2" |Best British Female
|
|-
| style="text-align:left;"|1995
|
|-
| style="text-align:left;"|2005
| "Wuthering Heights"
| Best Song of the Past 25 Years
|
|-
| style="text-align:left;" rowspan="2"|2006
| Herself
| Best British Female
|
|-
| Aerial
| Best British Album 
|
|-
| style="text-align:left;"|2012
| Herself
| Best British Female
|

Classic Pop Readers' Awards
Classic Pop is a monthly British music magazine, which launched in October 2012. It was devised and founded by Ian Peel, who was also editor for the first 19 issues.  Rik Flynn stepped in as editor until Issue 23 followed by current editor Steve Harnell.  Ian Peel remains involved as Founder & Editor-at-Large.

|-
| 2019
| Remastered
| Reissue of the Year
|

Edison Awards

The Edison music award is an annual Dutch music prize, awarded for outstanding achievements in the music industry. It is one of the oldest music awards in the world, having been presented since 1960.

|-
| style="text-align:left;"|1979
| "Wuthering Heights"
| Best International Single
|

Evening Standard Theatre Awards

The Evening Standard Theatre Awards, established in 1955, are presented annually for outstanding achievements in London Theatre. Sponsored by the Evening Standard newspaper, they are announced in late November or early December. They are the equivalent of the Broadway theatre Drama Desk Awards.

|-
| style="text-align:left;"|2014
| Before the Dawn
| Editor's Award 
|

GAFFA Awards

Denmark GAFFA Awards
Delivered since 1991, the GAFFA Awards are a Danish award that rewards popular music by the magazine of the same name.

!
|-
| 2005
| Herself
| Best Foreign Female Act
| 
| style="text-align:center;" |
|-
|}

Groovevolt Music and Fashion Awards

|-
| 2007
| Aerial
| Best Rock Album - Female
|

Grammy Awards
The Grammy Awards are awarded annually by The Recording Academy of the United States for outstanding achievements in the music industry. Often considered the highest music honour, the awards were established in 1958.

|-
| style="text-align:left;"|1988
| "Experiment IV"
| Best Concept Music Video 
|
|-
| style="text-align:left;"|1991
| "The Sensual World"
| Best Alternative Music Performance
|
|-
| style="text-align:left;"|1996
| The Line, the Cross and the Curve
| Best Music Video, Long Form
|

IM&MC Music Video Awards

!Ref.
|-
| 1986
| "Cloudbusting"
| Best Female Performance
| 
|

Ivor Novello Awards

The Ivor Novello Awards are awarded for songwriting and composing. The awards, named after the Cardiff born entertainer Ivor Novello, are presented annually in London by the British Academy of Songwriters, Composers and Authors (BASCA).

|-
| style="text-align:left;" rowspan="3"|1979
| rowspan="2"| "Wuthering Heights"
| The Best Song Musically and Lyrically 
|
|-
| The Best Pop Song
|
|-
| "The Man with the Child in His Eyes"
| The Outstanding British Lyric
|
|-
| style="text-align:left;"|1981
| "Babooshka"
| The Best Song Musically and Lyrically 
|
|-
| style="text-align:left;"|1983
| "The Dreaming"
| The Outstanding British Lyric
|
|-
| style="text-align:left;"|1986
| "Running Up That Hill"
| Best Contemporary Song
|
|-
| style="text-align:left;"|2002
| Herself
| Outstanding Contribution to British Music
|
|-
| style="text-align:left;"|2012
| 50 Words for Snow
| Album Award 
|

MIDEM Video Awards

|-
| style="text-align:left;"|1980
| "Babooshka"
| Best International Performance
|

MOJO Awards

MOJO Awards are awarded by the popular British music magazine, Mojo, published monthly by Bauer.

|-
| style="text-align:left;"|2005
| rowspan="2" |Herself
| rowspan="2" |Songwriter Award
|
|-
| style="text-align:left;"|2006
|

MTV Video Music Awards

The MTV Video Music Awards were established in the end of the summer of 1984 by MTV to celebrate the top music videos of the year.

|-
| style="text-align:left;"|1986
| "Running Up That Hill"
| rowspan="2"| Best Female Video
|
|-
| style="text-align:left;"|1987
| "The Big Sky"
|

Music Week Awards
The Music Week Awards event is the biggest night in the UK music calendar and recognises outstanding contributions made to the music industry. The awards are voted for by an independent panel.

|-
| style="text-align:left;"|2019
| Herself
| Catalogue Marketing Campaign 
|

NME Awards

The NME Awards are an annual music awards show founded by the music magazine NME. Bush received one awards from three nominations.

|-
| style="text-align:left;"|1979
| rowspan="2"| Herself
| Best Female Singer
|
|-
| style="text-align:left;" rowspan="2"|2015
| Hero of the Year
|
|-
| Kate Bush's return
| Music Moment of the Year
|

Progressive Music Awards

Prog magazine was also behind the annual Progressive Music Awards that was established in 2012.

|-
| style="text-align:left;"|2012
| rowspan="2" |Herself
| Prog Goddess
|
|-
| style="text-align:left;" rowspan="2"|2015
| Artist of the Year
|
|-
| Before the Dawn
| Live Event of the Year
|

Q Awards

The Q Awards are the UK's annual music awards run by the music magazine Q to honor musical excellence. Winners are voted by readers of Q online, with others decided by a judging panel. Bush received one award from three nominations.

|-
| style="text-align:left;"|2001
| rowspan="3"|Herself
| Q Classic Songwriter Award
|
|-
| style="text-align:left;" rowspan="2"|2014
| Best Act in the World Today
|
|-
| Best Live Act
|

Rober Awards Music Poll

|-
| rowspan=2|2011
| rowspan=3|Herself
| Best Female Artist 
| 
|-
| Return of the Year 
| 
|-
| 2014
| Best Live Artist 
| 
|-
| 2016
| Before the Dawn
| Best Compilation
|

Rock and Roll Hall of Fame

The Rock and Roll Hall of Fame is a museum located on the shores of Lake Erie in downtown Cleveland, Ohio, United States, dedicated to the recording history of some of the best-known and most influential artists, producers, and other people who have influenced the music industry.

|-
| 2018
| Performer 
| Hall of Fame
| 
|-
| 2021 
| Performer 
| Hall of Fame
| 
|-
| 2022 
|Performer 
| Hall of Fame
| 
|-
| 2023 
|Performer 
| Hall of Fame
|

Smash Hits Poll Winners Part 
The Smash Hits Poll Winners Party was an awards ceremony held annually by British magazine Smash Hits, and broadcast on BBC One.

|- 
| rowspan=2|1980
| rowspan=5|Herself
| Best Female Singer 
| 
|-
| rowspan=2|Most Fanciable Female 
| 
|-
| rowspan=2|1981
| 
|-
| rowspan=2|Best Female Singer 
| 
|-
| 1982
|

Satellite Awards

The Satellite Awards are an annual award given by the International Press Academy. Bush has been nominated once.

|-
| style="text-align:left;"|2007
| "Lyra"
| Best Original Song
|

South Bank Sky Arts Awards

The South Bank Show is a television arts magazine show that was produced by ITV between 1978 and 2010, and by Sky Arts from 2012. Bush has won once.

|-
| style="text-align:left;"|2012
| 50 Words for Snow
| Best Album
|

Variety Hitmakers
The Variety Hitmakers are given annually since 2017 to recognize the writers, producers, publishers, and other key personnel behind the scenes "who helped make―and break―the most consumed songs of the year as compiled by BuzzAngle Music". Bush was recognized the Sync of the Year at the 2022's ceremony.

|-
| 2022
| "Running Up That Hill (A Deal with God)"
| Sync of the Year
| 
|-
|}

Žebřík Music Awards

!Ref.
|-
| 1994
| Herself
| Best International Female
| 
|

1979
 BPI Awards
 Best Female Singer
 Record Mirror Poll
 Best New Artist, 1978
 Melody Maker Annual Poll Awards
 Best Female Singer, 1979

1980
 BPI Awards
 Best Female Singer
 Music Week annual awards
 Top Female Artist, 1979
 Capital Radio Awards
 Best Female Vocalist, 1979
 Record Mirror poll
 Best Female Singer, 1979
 TV Times top ten awards
 Most exciting TV female singer 1979

1987
 US College Music Awards
 Best British Female Solo Artist

References

Awards
Bush, Kate
Bush, Kate